Edulis, edible in Latin, is a species name present in a number of Latin species names:

 Acioa edulis, the Castanha-de-cutia, a fruit and timber tree species
 Aglaia edulis, a plant species found in Bhutan, Cambodia, China, India, Indonesia and Malaysia
 Allophylus edulis, a plant species endemic to Guyanas, Brazil, Bolivia, Paraguay, Argentina and Uruguay
 Amana edulis, a flowering bulb that is native to China, Japan, and Korea
 Boletus edulis, the cep, a mushroom species
 Brahea edulis, the Guadalupe palm or palma de Guadalupe, a palm species native and almost endemic to Guadalupe Island, Mexico
 Canna edulis, a synonym of Canna indica, the edible species of the genus Canna
 Caralluma edulis, a succulent plant species
 Carissa edulis, a synonym of Carissa spinarum, the conkerberry or bush plum, a shrub species
 Carpobrotus edulis, a creeping, mat-forming succulent plant species
 Casimiroa edulis, the white sapote, custard apple and cochitzapotl in Nahuatl, a plant species
 Catha edulis, the khat, a flowering plant species
 Commiphora edulis, (Klotzsch) Engl., a plant species in the genus Commiphora
 Cordeauxia edulis, also known as the ye'eb, yeheb or jeheb nut, a tree species
 Coula edulis, a tree species native to tropical western Africa from Sierra Leone to Angola
 Dacryodes edulis, the safou, a fruit tree species native to Africa
 Dudleya edulis (= Echeveria edulis), the fingertip, a succulent plant species native to southern California and Baja California
 Daucus edulis, a species of celery endemic to Madeira, Portugal
 Euterpe edulis, the juçara, açaí-do-sul or palmiteiro, a palm tree species
 Gymnopilus edulis, a species of mushroom in the family Cortinariaceae
 Inga edulis, a fruit native to South America
 Lithocarpus edulis, a species of stone-oak native to Japan
 Maerua edulis (Gilg. & Ben.) De Wolf, a plant species in the genus Maerua
 Metteniusa edulis, a plant species endemic to Colombia
 Mytilus edulis, the blue mussel, a medium-sized edible marine bivalve mollusc species
 Ostrea edulis, a species of oyster native to Europe
 Passiflora edulis, a plant species cultivated commercially in frost-free areas for its fruit
 Phyllostachys edulis (= Bambusa edulis), a bamboo species
 Pinus edulis, a pine species
 Plectranthus edulis, an annual plant species
 Plinia edulis, the cambucá, a tree species found in Brazil
 Pueraria edulis, a plant species belonging to the genus Pueraria
 Pyxicephalus edulis, the edible bullfrog, a frog species
 Trichonephila edulis (= Aranea edulis), a species of large spider of the family Nephilidae commonly found in Australia and in parts of New Guinea and New Caledonia

See also
 Including use as a species name
List of Latin and Greek words commonly used in systematic names
 Edule (disambiguation), a Latin word with the same meaning